Jan and Antonina Żabiński can refer to:
 Jan Żabiński
 Antonina Żabińska